Can You Stand the Heat is Ana Popović's sixth studio album, released on March 27, 2013 on ArtisteXclusive records. The album has eleven original songs and three cover songs, and features guest appearances with Grammy Award winner Tommy Sims and Grammy nominee Lucky Peterson, and was produced by B.B. King's drummer of twenty-five years, Tony Coleman. She met Coleman when she was opening for B.B. King, and they wondered if groovy blues was fading from the scene, so they came up with the idea of making a blues album in the style of Albert Collins and Albert King, using funk and "old-school" soul. Popović relocated her family from Amsterdam to Memphis so that she could record at Ardent Studios and to embrace the music aura that circulates in the city's perennial juke joints. The title track, "Can You Stand the Heat", was released as single before the album was released, and a video was shot for the song, directed Jonathan Pekar.

Track list

Personnel

Musicians
 Ana Popović – vocals, lead guitar, slide guitar, acoustic guitar
 John Williams – bass
 Frank Ray, Jr. – keys
 Harold Smith – rhythm guitar
 Tony Coleman – drums
 Tauris Turner – drums (track 4)
 Marc Franklin – trumpet
 Kirk Smothers – saxophone
 Lucky Peterson – vocals, guitar, organ (track 6)
 Tommy Sims – bass (track 13), vocals (track 14)
 Felix Hernandez – percussion (track 11)
 Javier Solis – drums, percussion (tracks 13 & 14)
 Sherry Williams & John Williams – background vocals (tracks 1, 7 & 12)
 Stephanie Bolton & Sharisse Norman – backing vocals (tracks 3, 4 & 5)
 John Williams & Frank Ray, Jr. – backing vocals (track 11)
 Jerard Woods & Jovaun Woods – backing vocals (track 14)
 Children choir (Jovanni Ramirez, Jerard Woods II, Justin Woods, Sarah-Clayton McBrayer, EmmyLayne Myers, Noelle Jamison, Nori Jamison) (tracks 13 & 14)

Production
 Ana Popović - production
 Tony Coleman - production
 Tommy Sims - production (tracks 13 & 14)
 Pete Matthews - engineering and mixing at Ardent recording studios (tracks 1, 2, 3, 5, 6, 8, 9, 11 & 12)
 James Waddell - engineering and mixing at Lyricanvas Studios (tracks 4, 7, 10, 13 & 14)
 Brad Blackwood - mastering
 Recorded in April and October 2012 at Ardent recording studio in Memphis, TN. Recorded in January 2013 at Lyricanvas Studios in Nashville, TN.

References

2013 albums
Ana Popović albums